Ross Wood (born 25 September 1941) is a former English cricket umpire from Basingstoke, Hampshire. Wood first stood in county cricket in a match between Buckinghamshire and Berkshire in the 1991 Minor Counties Championship. He would stand in a further 41 Minor Counties Championship matches, the last of which was in a match between Oxfordshire and Devon in the 2002 Minor Counties Championship. He also stood in twelve MCCA Knockout Trophy matches from 1996 to 2002, He first stood in a match which held List A status when Hertfordshire played the Leicestershire Cricket Board in the 1999 NatWest Trophy. He stood in six further List A matches, the last of which was between the Hampshire Cricket Board and Staffordshire in the 2003 Cheltenham & Gloucester Trophy.

His son, Julian, played first-class cricket for Hampshire.

References

External links
Ross Wood at CricketArchive

1941 births
Living people
People from Basingstoke
English cricket umpires